Next Future is the second album from Girl Next Door released on January 20, 2010. It was released in two versions, a Normal Edition and an Album+DVD version. The first press of the Album+DVD version came with a special booklet, while the first press of the Normal Edition came with a Non-Stop Euro Remix disc of their debut album Girl Next Door, excluding the instrumentals.

This is their 1st album to debut #1 on the Oricon charts.

Track list 

2010 albums
Girl Next Door (band) albums